Álvaro Robles (born 29 April 1991) is a Spanish table tennis player.

He won a medal at the 2019 World Table Tennis Championships.

References

External links

Spanish male table tennis players
1991 births
Living people
World Table Tennis Championships medalists
Table tennis players at the 2015 European Games
Table tennis players at the 2019 European Games
European Games competitors for Spain
Table tennis players at the 2020 Summer Olympics
Mediterranean Games gold medalists for Spain
Mediterranean Games medalists in table tennis
Competitors at the 2022 Mediterranean Games
Olympic table tennis players of Spain